"Fat Lip" is a song by Canadian rock band Sum 41. It is the fourth track on their debut album, All Killer No Filler (2001), and was released as the lead single in April 2001. It is the band's most successful single to date, topping the Billboard Modern Rock Tracks chart. It peaked at number 66 on the Billboard Hot 100 chart and at number eight on the UK Singles Chart.

Background and composition
"Fat Lip" was written by Sum 41 members Deryck Whibley, Steve Jocz and Dave Brownsound, and in-house producer Greig Nori, with production by Jerry Finn. The song gets its title from the slang term for a swollen lip as a result of being punched in the face.

"It was the last song I had written for All Killer [No Filler]," Whibley told Stereogum in 2021. "The whole album was pretty much done. It was never meant to be a single. It wasn't even supposed to be a song. The very, very first thing I wrote was the guitar riff. And I didn't necessarily write it for this idea that I had for this sort of punk rock-rap kind of thing. I knew I had this old school rap idea mixed with punk rock sort of stuff, but I wrote this riff just as a riff. And then I ended up writing a chorus, like, months later. And then I had this verse. And none of them were supposed to be together. They were just separate things that I was writing over time. And then one day it kind of clicked, and I thought, 'Well, these all kind of work. They're all around the same tempo, they're all the same key.' I changed a few things and made it work, now all of a sudden I was like, 'OK, I've got the rap part, I've got a riff, and I've got a chorus.' But I don’t have the rest of the song. And then it took a long time before pieces just kind of came together."

The uptempo song has been described as pop punk, skate punk, rap rock, hard rock and easycore, with Whibley, Brownsound, and Jocz sharing vocal duties. "The verses are really about what we do: growing up in the suburbs, going to parties and hanging out with our friends, and causing trouble. A lot of people say they relate to it," said Whibley. Brian Hiatt of MTV.com described the song as "pop-punk-meets-hip-hop."

Music video
The song topped MTV's Total Request Live and MuchMusic's MuchMusic Countdown in the summer of 2001. In the original Canadian version, the music video combines with fellow All Killer No Filler track "Pain for Pleasure", a very short Iron Maiden-esque song which is the final song on the album. The video, filmed in Pomona, California, was ranked at number 75 on "MuchMusic's 100 Best Videos". At the beginning of the music video, the band performs an a cappella of the first half of the first verse of "It's What We're All About"—which would be their future single—for the staff of a liquor store (likely the store frequently seen in the background throughout the video).

On July 31, 2022, the video was officially remastered in HD.

Live performances
The song was performed on Saturday Night Live on October 6, 2001, hosted by Seann William Scott.

Track listings

Canadian and Australian CD single
 "Fat Lip" – 3:02
 "Makes No Difference" – 3:10
 "What I Believe" – 2:49
 "Machine Gun" – 2:29

UK CD single
 "Fat Lip" (radio/clean edit) – 3:02
 "Crazy Amanda Bunkface" (live)
 "Machine Gun" (live)
 "Fat Lip" (CD-ROM video)

UK cassette single
 "Fat Lip" (radio/clean edit)
 "Crazy Amanda Bunkface" (live)

UK DVD single
 "Fat Lip" (video)
 "Pain for Pleasure" (audio)
 "Meet the Pain" (video)

European CD single
 "Fat Lip" – 3:02
 "Makes No Difference" – 3:10

Personnel
 Deryck Whibley – lead vocals, rhythm guitar
 Dave Baksh – lead guitar, backing and co-lead vocals
 Jason McCaslin – bass guitar, backing vocals
 Steve Jocz – drums, percussion, co-lead vocals

Charts

Weekly charts

Year-end charts

Certifications

Release history

References

2001 singles
2001 songs
Island Records singles
Music videos directed by Marc Klasfeld
Rap rock songs
Songs written by Dave Baksh
Songs written by Deryck Whibley
Songs written by Greig Nori
Songs written by Steve Jocz
Sum 41 songs